Arfa may refer to the following people
Given name
Arfa Siddiq (born 1987), Pakistani politician and leader of the Pashtun Tahafuz Movement
Arfa Karim (1995–2012), Pakistani computer programmer 
Arfa Software Technology Park named after Arfa Karim

Surname
Hasan Arfa (1895–1984), Iranian general and ambassador 
Hatem Ben Arfa (born 1987), French football player
Abu'l Hasan ibn Arfa Ra'a (died 1197), Muslim chemist